Cam Millar may refer to:
 Cam Millar (Canadian sportsman) (1927–2020), Canadian player of football, ice hockey and golf
 Cam Millar (rugby union) (born 2001/2002), New Zealand rugby union player